Cederqvist is a Swedish surname. Notable people with the surname include:

Jane Cederqvist (1945–2023), Swedish swimmer
Pär Cederqvist (born 1980), Swedish footballer

See also
Cederquist

Swedish-language surnames